The Federal Correctional Complex, Butner (FCC Butner) is a United States federal prison complex for men near Butner, North Carolina. It is operated by the Federal Bureau of Prisons, a division of the United States Department of Justice. It includes the Bureau's largest medical complex, which operates a drug treatment program and specializes in oncology and behavioral science. Among its inmates was Bernie Madoff, who was convicted for perpetrating the largest Ponzi scheme in history. He died at the prison in April 2021.

The complex consists of four facilities:

 Federal Correctional Institution, Butner Low (FCI Butner Low): a low-security facility.
 Federal Correctional Institution, Butner Medium (FCI Butner Medium): a medium-security facility.
Federal Correctional Institution 2, Butner Medium (FCI 2 Butner Medium): a medium-security facility
 Federal Medical Center, Butner (FMC Butner): a facility which houses inmates of all security levels with health issues.

The complex lies in an unincorporated area on the county line between Durham County to the west and Granville County to the east. On the Durham County side, the portion of the prison is in Mangum Township, while on the Granville County side it is in Dutchville Township.

Notable incidents

Madoff assault
On March 18, 2010, The Wall Street Journal reported that Bernie Madoff, the New York financier serving a 150-year sentence at FCI Butner for running a Ponzi scheme that cost investors billions of dollars, was assaulted by another inmate in December 2009. Citing three sources, a current inmate, a former inmate, and a prison employee, the newspaper reported that the assailant was an inmate serving time for a drug conviction who believed that Madoff owed him money. The inmate reported that Madoff suffered a broken nose, fractured ribs, and cuts to his head and face. In response to the report, Bureau of Prisons spokeswoman Denise Simmons said, "We have no knowledge or information to confirm he was assaulted."

Murder plot
On November 16, 2011, James Lukinoff, an inmate at FCI Butner, was indicted for planning to assault and kill an FBI agent involved in investigating the crime for which he was sent to prison. The indictment alleged that from February 2009 to April 2011, Lukinoff developed and pursued a plan to purchase a suppressor and have a friend or family member store it until his release from prison. Once released, Lukinoff planned to retrieve the suppressor and his firearm and kill the agent. Lukinoff pleaded guilty to retaliating against a federal official by threat on June 20, 2012.  He is currently being held at the Federal Medical Center, Butner and is scheduled for release in 2024.

Notable inmates

High-profile crimes

Organized crime

Financial crimes

Espionage

In popular culture
 In the final episode of the television series Better Call Saul, the series' main character Saul Goodman refers to Butner as his ideal prison, and unsuccessfully attempts to serve his sentence there.

See also

List of U.S. federal prisons
Federal Bureau of Prisons
Incarceration in the United States

References

External links
Official profile from the Federal Bureau of Prisons
"FCI Butner Medium II (design)." John J. Kirlin, LLC.
"Butner Federal Correctional Institution." Moseley Architects.

Buildings and structures in Durham County, North Carolina
Butner
Buildings and structures in Granville County, North Carolina
Prisons in North Carolina